Holy Trinity Catholic Church may refer to:
 Holy Trinity Catholic Church (Shreveport, Louisiana)
 Holy Trinity Catholic Church (Washington, D.C.)
 Holy Trinity Catholic Church (Luxemburg, Iowa)
 Holy Trinity Catholic Church (Honolulu)
 Holy Trinity Catholic Church (Trinity, Indiana)
 Holy Trinity Catholic Church, Braamfontein